Ben Jongejan (born 9 January 1985) is a Dutch long track speed skater who participates in international competitions.

Personal records

Career highlights

European Allround Championships
2008 - Kolomna,  6th
National Championships
2007- Groningen,  allround
2010 - Heerenveen, 5th allround

External links
Jongejan at Jakub Majerski's Speedskating Database
Jongejan at SkateResults.com

1985 births
Living people
Dutch male speed skaters
People from Leidschendam
Speed skaters at the 2007 Winter Universiade
Dutch speed skating coaches
Dutch sports coaches
Sportspeople from South Holland